The  is a professional golf tournament on the Japan Golf Tour. It is played at the ABC Golf Club in Katō, Hyōgo, usually in October or November. It was founded in 1971 as a Japan vs. United States team match (there was also individual prize money and the event counted as an official win on tour). In 1988, it became a full-field individual event. The event is sponsored by Asahi Broadcasting Corporation and Mynavi Corporation.

History
The tournament was founded in 1971 as the Miki Gold Cup, a nine-man team match between golfers from Japan and the United States. Results were based on the aggregate of the best seven scores from each team after 54 holes of stroke play competition; there was also a prize for the best individual score. The event was renamed as the ABC Cup in 1972. The following year, the best eight scores were used to determine the winner, and in 1975 the event was extended to 72 holes.

Between 1982 and 1984 the event was titled as the Goldwin Cup (1982–83) and the Uchida Yoko Cup (1984), during which time it was contested as stroke play matches with two points were awarded for a match win and one point for a tie. The first two rounds were played as better ball pairs and the final two rounds as singles, from which the scores were used to determine the individual winner. In 1985 the event reverted to its earlier format and name.

In 1988, the tournament became a regular 72 hole stroke play event on the Japan Golf Tour, since when it has always been held at ABC Golf Club in Katō, Hyōgo. Sponsored by Philip Morris International, it was titled using the Lark brand as the ABC Lark Cup or Lark Cup for five years, until 1994 when it became the Philip Morris Championship. After Philip Morris sponsorship came to an end, in 2003 the event became titled the ABC Championship, with Mynavi being added as title sponsor in 2008.

Tournament hosts

Winners

Japan vs USA team matches

Notes

References

External links
 
Coverage on the Japan Golf Tour's official site

Japan Golf Tour events
Golf tournaments in Japan
Sport in Hyōgo Prefecture
Asahi Broadcasting Corporation original programming
Recurring sporting events established in 1971
1971 establishments in Japan
Team golf tournaments